The National Christian Party, also known as the Awakening National Christian Party is a conservative political party in Armenia.

History
The party was founded on 29 April 2021 during the 2020–2021 Armenian protests, and is led by Ara Zohrabyan. The party confirmed it would participate in the 2021 Armenian parliamentary elections. Following the election, the party won just 0.36% of the popular vote.

The party does not maintain any representation within the National Assembly and currently acts as an extra-parliamentary force.

In November 2021, the party participated in local elections in the city of Gyumri, winning 4 seats on the Gyumri city council.

Ideology
The party seeks to develop a strong nation-state, strengthen the military, develop the economy, and protect the rights of citizens, while basing its core beliefs on Christian values and protecting the role of the Armenian Apostolic Church in society. The party also supports the self-determination of Artsakh.

Electoral record

Parliamentary elections

See also

 Programs of political parties in Armenia

References

External links 
 National Christian Party on Facebook

Political parties established in 2021
Political parties in Armenia
Conservative parties in Armenia
2021 establishments in Armenia
Christian democratic parties in Europe